William Nwadinobi "Willy" Okpara (born 7 May 1968) is a Nigerian former professional footballer who played as a goalkeeper. Having started his career with ACB Lagos, he spent more than a decade with South African side Orlando Pirates.

Career
Born in Lagos, Okpara played for ACB Lagos from 1987 to 1989 before moving to South African side Orlando Pirates. Okpara was the club's first choice goalkeeper from 1990 to 2002, losing his place to Congolese goalkeeper Michel Babale during 2002–03 season, then becoming an understudy to Thabang Radebe and Francis Chansa before retiring in 2005. He holds the record of Pirates' appearances with 375 matches, and is also the club's longest serving player. He was part of the 1995 CAF Champions League winning team.

International career
Okpara was Nigeria under-20's first choice goalkeeper during 1987 FIFA World Youth Championship, playing in all three matches as Nigeria failed to win during the group stage. He played for Nigeria national futsal team at 1992 FIFA Futsal World Championship as an outfield player, featuring in the 5–4 loss against Poland when he was sent off.

He made his debut for the Nigeria national team in 1996 and was selected for the 1998 FIFA World Cup squad.

Retirement
After his retirement, Okpara became a goalkeeping coach for Orlando Pirates.

Honours
 Premier Soccer League: 2000–01, 2002–03
 National Soccer League: 1994
 Nedbank Cup: 1996
 MTN 8: 1993, 1996, 2000
 Castle Challenge: 1992
 CAF Champions League: 1995
 CAF Super Cup: 1996

References

External links

Orlando Pirates player profile - William Okpara

1968 births
Living people
Nigerian footballers
Association football goalkeepers
Nigeria international footballers
Nigeria under-20 international footballers
1998 FIFA World Cup players
ACB Lagos F.C. players
Orlando Pirates F.C. players
Nigerian expatriate footballers
Nigerian expatriate sportspeople in South Africa
Expatriate soccer players in South Africa
Association football goalkeeping coaches
Futsal goalkeepers